Clivina sicula is a species of ground beetle in the subfamily Scaritinae. It was described by Baudi in 1864.

References

sicula
Beetles described in 1864